"Something I've Never Had" is a song by American R&B/soul singer Miki Howard. Released on October 22, 1996 as a single in support of her album, Can't Count Me Out. The song didn't chart on Billboard's Hot 100 or R&B/Hip-Hop songs; however, it received minor airplay rotation on R&B stations.

Track listings and formats
U.S. CD single, 12" Inch single
"Something I've Never Had" (Album Version) - 4:48
"Something I've Never Had" (Radio Edit) – 4:33
"Something I've Never Had" (Breakdown Version)
"Something I've Never Had" (Instrumental) - 4:48
"Something I've Never Had" (A Capella)

References

1997 singles
Miki Howard songs
Song recordings produced by LeMel Humes
1997 songs
Songs written by LeMel Humes
Contemporary R&B ballads
1990s ballads